The 2002 CA-TennisTrophy was a men's tennis tournament played on indoor hard courts at the Wiener Stadthalle in Vienna, Austria and was part of the International Series Gold of the 2002 ATP Tour. It was the 28th edition of the tournament and was held from 7 October until 13 October 2002. Sixth-seeded Roger Federer won the singles title.

Finals

Singles

 Roger Federer defeated  Jiří Novák 6–4, 6–1, 3–6, 6–4
 It was Federer's 3rd singles title of the year and the 4th of his career.

Doubles

 Joshua Eagle /  Sandon Stolle defeated  Jiří Novák /  Radek Štěpánek 6–4, 6–3
 It was Eagle's 3rd title of the year and the 5th of his career. It was Stolle's only title of the year and the 22nd of his career.

References

External links
 Official website
 ATP tournament profile
 ITF tournament edition details

CA-TennisTrophy
Vienna Open